Saara Vilhelmiina Ranin (originally Muinonen; 3 March 1898 in Hamina – 3 March 1992) was a Finnish actress and director. She made a long career in various Finnish theatres while also appearing in several films. Saara Ranin was married to Helge Ranin, and actor Matti Ranin was their son.

As a film actress, Ranin is best remembered as Amalia Rygseck in the Matti Kassila film Komisario Palmun erehdys (1960). Her final film appearance also came in a Kassila film, Natalia (1979).  Saara Ranin died in 1992 on her 94th birthday after a short illness.

Selected filmography 

Ei auta itku markkinoilla (1927)
Sinut minä tahdon (1949)
Hilman päivät (1954)
Pastori Jussilainen (1955)
Island Girl (1953)
Minä ja mieheni morsian (1955)
Virtaset ja Lahtiset (1959)
Komisario Palmun erehdys (1960)
Pikku Pietarin piha (1961)

References

External links 
 

1898 births
1992 deaths
People from Hamina
People from Viipuri Province (Grand Duchy of Finland)
Finnish film actresses
20th-century Finnish actresses